Sphaerotheca  may refer to:
 Sphaerotheca (frog), a genus of frogs in the family Dicroglossidae
 Sphaerotheca (fungus), a genus of fungi in the family Erysiphaceae